Several schools in the U.S. are named Portland High School including:

Gregory-Portland High School — Portland, Texas
Portland Adventist Academy — Portland, Oregon
Portland High School — Portland, Connecticut
Portland Arts and Technology High School — Portland, Maine
Portland Christian School — Louisville, Kentucky
Portland High School, which became Lincoln High School (Portland, Oregon) in 1909
Portland Christian Schools — Portland, Oregon
Portland High School — Portland, Indiana
Portland High School (Maine) — Portland, Maine
Portland High School (Michigan) — Portland, Michigan
Portland High School (Tennessee) — Portland, Tennessee
South Portland High School — South Portland, Maine